The Hymn to Enlil, Enlil and the Ekur (Enlil A), Hymn to the Ekur, Hymn and incantation to Enlil, Hymn to Enlil the all beneficent or Excerpt from an exorcism is a Sumerian myth, written on clay tablets in the late third millennium BC.

Compilation

Fragments of the text were discovered in the University of Pennsylvania Museum of Archaeology and Anthropology catalogue of the Babylonian section (CBS) from their excavations at the temple library at Nippur. The myth was first published using tablet CBS 8317, translated by George Aaron Barton in 1918 as "Sumerian religious texts" in "Miscellaneous Babylonian Inscriptions", number ten, entitled "An excerpt from an exorcism". A larger fragment of the text was found on CBS tablet number 14152 and first published by Henry Frederick Lutz as "A hymn and incantation to Enlil" in "Selected Sumerian and Babylonian Texts", number 114 in 1919. Barton's tablet had only containted lines five to twenty four of the reverse of Lutz's, which had already been translated in 1918 and was used to complete several of his damaged lines.

Edward Chiera published tablet CBS 7924B from the hymn in "Sumerian Epics and Myths". He also worked with Samuel Noah Kramer to publish three other tablets CBS 8473, 10226, 13869 in "Sumerian texts of varied contents" in 1934. The name given this time was "Hymn to the Ekur", suggesting the tablets were "parts of a composition which extols the ekur of Enlil at Nippur, it may, however be only an extract from a longer text". Further tablets were found to be part of the myth in the Hilprecht collection at the University of Jena, Germany, numbers 1530, 1531, 1532, 1749b, 2610, 2648a and b, 2665, 2685, 1576 and 1577. Further tablets containing the text were excavated at Isin, modern Ishan al-Bahriyat, tablet 923. Another was found amongst the texts in the Iraq Museum, tablet 44351a. Others are held in the collections of the Abbey of Montserrat in Barcelona and the Ashmolean in Oxford.

Other translations were made from tablets in the Nippur collection of the Museum of the Ancient Orient in Istanbul (Ni). Samuel Noah Kramer amongst others worked to translate several others from the Istanbul collection including Ni 1039, 1180, 4005, 4044, 4150, 4339, 4377, 4584, 9563 and 9698. More were found at Henri de Genouillac's excavations at Kish (C 53). Another tablet of the myth (Si 231) was excavated at Sippar in the collections of the Istanbul Archaeological Museum. Sir Charles Leonard Woolley unearthed more tablets at Ur contained in the "Ur excavations texts" from 1928. Other tablets and versions were used to bring the myth to its present form with the latest translations presented by Thorkild Jacobsen, Miguel Civil and Joachim Krecher.

Composition

The hymn, noted by Kramer as one of the most important of its type, starts with praise for Enlil in his awe-inspiring dais:

The hymn develops by relating Enlil founding and creating the origin of the city of Nippur and his organization of the earth. In contrast to the myth of Enlil and Ninlil where the city exists before creation, here Enlil is shown to be responsible for its planning and construction, suggesting he surveyed and drew the plans before its creation:

The hymn moves on from the physical construction of the city and gives a description and veneration of its ethics and moral code:

The last sentence has been compared by R. P. Gordon to the description of Jerusalem in the Book of Isaiah, "the city of justice, righteousness dwelled in her" and in the Book of Jeremiah, "O habitation of justice, and mountain of holiness." The myth continues with the city's inhabitants building a temple dedicated to Enlil, referred to as the Ekur. The priestly positions and responsibilities of the Ekur are listed along with an appeal for Enlil's blessings on the city, where he is regarded as the source of all prosperity:

A similar passage to the last lines above has been noted in the Biblical Psalms "The voice of the Lord makes hinds to calve and makes goats to give birth (too) quickly". The hymn concludes with further reference to Enlil as a farmer and praise for his wife, Ninlil:

Andrew R. George suggested that the hymn to Enlil "can be incorporated into longer compositions" as with the Kesh temple hymn and "the hymn to temples in Ur that introduces a Shulgi hymn."

Discussion

The poetic form and laudatory content of the hymn have shown similarities to the Book of Psalms in the Bible, particularly Psalm 23 "The Lord is my shepherd, I shall not want, he maketh me to lie down in green pastures." Line eighty four mentions:

and in line ninety one, Enlil is referred to as a shepherd:

The shepherd motif originating in this myth is also found describing Jesus in the Book of John. Joan Westenholz noted that "The farmer image was even more popular than the shepherd in the earliest personal names, as might be expected in an agrarian society." She notes that both Falkenstein and Thorkild Jacobsen consider the farmer refers to the king of Nippur; Reisman has suggested that the farmer or 'engar' of the Ekur was likely to be Ninurta. The term appears in line sixty

Wayne Horowitz discusses the use of the word abzu, normally used as a name for an abzu temple, god, cosmic place or cultic water basin. In the hymn to Enlil, its interior is described as a 'distant sea':

The foundations of Enlil's temple are made of lapis lazuli, which has been linked to the "soham" stone used in the Book of Ezekiel describing the materials used in the building of "Eden, the Garden of god" perched on "the mountain of the lord", Zion, and in the Book of Job "The stones of it are the place of sapphires and it hath dust of gold". Precious stones are also later repeated in a similar context describing decoration of the walls of New Jerusalem in the Apocalypse.

Along with the Kesh Temple Hymn, Steve Tinney has identified the Hymn to Enlil as part of a standard sequence of scribal training scripts he refers to as the Decad. He suggested that "the Decad constituted a required program of literary learning, used almost without exception throughout Babylonia. The Decad thus included almost all literary types available in Sumerian."

See also
 Barton Cylinder
 Debate between Winter and Summer
 Debate between sheep and grain
 Enlil and Ninlil
 Old Babylonian oracle
 Kesh temple hymn
 Self-praise of Shulgi (Shulgi D)
 Lament for Ur
 Sumerian creation myth
 Sumerian religion
 Sumerian literature

References

Further reading
 Falkenstein, Adam, Sumerische Götterlieder (Abhandlungen der Heidelberger Akademie der Wissenschaften, Phil.-hist. Kl., Jahrgang 1959, 1. Abh.). Carl Winter UniversitätsVerlag: Heidelberg, 5-79, 1959.
 Jacobsen, Thorkild, The Harps that Once ... Sumerian Poetry in Translation. Yale University Press: New Haven/London, 151-166: translation, pp 101–111, 1987.
 Reisman, Daniel David, Two Neo-Sumerian Royal Hymns (Ph.D. dissertation). University of Pennsylvania: Philadelphia, 41-102, 1970.
 Römer, W.H.Ph., 'Review of Jacobsen 1987', Bibliotheca Orientalis 47, 382-390, 1990.

External links
 Barton, George Aaron., Miscellaneous Babylonian Inscriptions, Yale University Press, 1918. Online Version
 Lutz, Frederick Henry., Selected Sumerian and Babylonian texts, The University Museum, pp. 54-. Online Version
 Cheira, Edward., Sumerian Epics and Myths, University of Chicago, Oriental Institute Publications, 1934. Online Version
 Chiera, Edward and Kramer, Samuel Noah., Sumerian texts of varied contents, Number 116, University of Chicago Oriental Institute Publications Volume XVI, Cuneiform series - volume IV, 1934. - Online Version
 Enlil and the Ekur (Enlil A)., Black, J.A., Cunningham, G., Robson, E., and Zólyomi, G., The Electronic Text Corpus of Sumerian Literature, Oxford 1998-.
 Enlil A - ETCSL composite text
 Cuneiform Digital Library Initiative - CBS 08317
 
 Enlil in the Ekur - set to music on Youtube

3rd-millennium BC literature
1918 archaeological discoveries
Hymns
Sumerian literature
Clay tablets
Mesopotamian myths
Mythological mountains
Creation myths
Religious cosmologies
Comparative mythology
Ancient Near East wisdom literature